Jeliński is a Polish masculine surname, its feminine counterpart is Jelińska. The surname may refer to the following notable people:
Frank Jelinski (born 1958), German racing driver
Marian Jeliński (born 1949), Polish academic
Michał Jeliński (born 1980), Polish rower

Polish-language surnames